Teresa Moodie (born 11 September 1978) is a former swimmer who competed internationally for Zimbabwe.

Career 
Moodie swam in the 1994 and 1998 Commonwealth Games, the 1996 Summer Olympic Games and the 1995 and 1999 All-Africa Games. She won a gold medal in the 4×100m free relay at the 1999 All-Africa Games, a silver medal in the 100m freestyle and a bronze in the 100m butterfly.

Personal life 
Moodie attended Vincennes University before going to the University of Tennessee. She was on the Lady Vols swimming team.

Her sister Storme represented Zimbabwe at the 1992 Summer Olympics in swimming.

References 

1978 births
Living people
University of Tennessee alumni
Competitors at the 1995 All-Africa Games
Competitors at the 1999 All-Africa Games
African Games medalists in swimming
Olympic swimmers of Zimbabwe
Swimmers at the 1996 Summer Olympics
Swimmers at the 1994 Commonwealth Games
Swimmers at the 1998 Commonwealth Games
Commonwealth Games competitors for Zimbabwe
Zimbabwean female butterfly swimmers
African Games gold medalists for Zimbabwe
Zimbabwean female freestyle swimmers